Valentina Cernoia (born 22 June 1991) is an Italian professional footballer who plays as a midfielder for Serie A club Juventus FC and the Italy women's national football team, which she represents since 2013.

Career
Cernoia first played in the Serie A with ACF Brescia in the 2009–10 season following the team's promotion. In the 2013–14 season she played the UEFA Champions League for the first time and made her debut in the Italian national team in the 2015 FIFA World Cup qualifiers. In the summer of 2017 she played her first final tournament, the UEFA Women's Euro 2017, and moved to the newly founded Juventus FC women's team after nearly a decade in Brescia.

Honours
Brescia
 Serie A: 2013–14, 2015–16
 Coppa Italia: 2012–13, 2014–15, 2015–16
 Italian Women's Super Cup: 2013–14, 2014–15, 2015–16

Juventus
 Serie A: 2017–18, 2018–19, 2019–20, 2020–21, 2021–22
 Coppa Italia: 2018–19, 
 Supercoppa Italiana: 2019, 2020–21, 2021–22

Individual
 AIC Best Women's XI: 2019

Career statistics

References

External links 

 

1991 births
Living people
Italian women's footballers
Italy women's international footballers
Serie A (women's football) players
A.C.F. Brescia Calcio Femminile players
Women's association football midfielders
Juventus F.C. (women) players
2019 FIFA Women's World Cup players
UEFA Women's Euro 2022 players
UEFA Women's Euro 2017 players